Alva Merlin Colquhoun (married name Wyatt, born 28 February 1942) is an Australian former freestyle and butterfly swimmer of the 1950s, who won a silver medal in the 4×100-metre freestyle relay at the 1960 Summer Olympics in Rome. She is perhaps best known for resolving a dispute at a team meeting during the Rome Olympics.

Making her first appearance for Australia at the 1958 British Empire and Commonwealth Games in Cardiff, Wales, Colquhuon combined with Dawn Fraser, Lorraine Crapp and Sandra Morgan to win the 110-yard freestyle. In the 110-yard freestyle, she was beaten into third place by her teammates Fraser and Crapp. In Rome, she anchored the team of Fraser, Crapp and Ilsa Konrads to a silver medal, trailing the American team by 2.4 seconds. However, she was in the spotlight when during a team meeting, officials had ordered Fraser to swim the butterfly leg in the 4×100-metre medley relay preliminaries in place of the first-choice butterfly swimmer Jan Andrew, who was ordered to rest ahead of her individual event. Fraser refused, hitting Andrew with a pillow. It was only when Colquhuon volunteered that the dispute was resolved. However, she was replaced by Andrew in the final.

She was married with two children and resided in Baddaginnie, Victoria.

See also
 List of Olympic medalists in swimming (women)
 World record progression 4 × 100 metres freestyle relay

References

External links
 
 
 
 

1942 births
Living people
Swimmers from Brisbane
Australian female butterfly swimmers
Olympic swimmers of Australia
Swimmers at the 1960 Summer Olympics
Olympic silver medalists for Australia
Australian female freestyle swimmers
Medalists at the 1960 Summer Olympics
Olympic silver medalists in swimming
Swimmers at the 1958 British Empire and Commonwealth Games
Commonwealth Games medallists in swimming
Commonwealth Games gold medallists for Australia
Commonwealth Games silver medallists for Australia
Commonwealth Games bronze medallists for Australia
Medallists at the 1958 British Empire and Commonwealth Games